Origo may refer to:

Origo (album), an album by the band Burst
Origo (moth), a genus of moth in the family Gelechiidae
Origo (pragmatics), a concept in pragmatics
"Origo" (song), the Hungarian representative for the Eurovision Song Contest 2017
Origo (website), a Hungarian news website
Iris Origo, writer
Origo Sound, a record label
Origo hf., an Icelandic information technology services company
Origo (EP), an extended play by singer Natalia Nykiel.
See also Origin (mathematics)